The Gambia participated in the 2010 Summer Youth Olympics in Singapore.

Athletics

Boys
Track and Road Events

Girls
Track and Road Events

References

External links
Competitors List: Gambia

Nations at the 2010 Summer Youth Olympics
Com
The Gambia at the Youth Olympics